King's X is the fourth studio album by heavy metal/hard rock trio King's X, released in 1992 through Atlantic Records. The album marked the end of the band's relationship with producer Sam Taylor.

Track listing

All songs written by Pinnick, Tabor & Gaskill, except "Prisoner", written by Pinnick, Tabor, Gaskill, Taylor, and Marty Warren.

Accolades
In 2022, Guitar World ranked King's X #15 on their list of "The 30 Greatest Rock Guitar Albums of 1992".

Charts

Singles - Billboard (North America)

Personnel

King's X
Doug Pinnick - bass guitars, vocals
Ty Tabor - guitars, dulcimer, sitar, Concertmate 650, vocals
Jerry Gaskill - drums & percussion, vocals

Additional musicians
 Max Dyer - cellos
 Sam Taylor (billed as "Little Willie T.") - 'pianto', organ splatches

References

External links
Official King's X Site, Accessed on July 10, 2005.

1992 albums
King's X albums
Atlantic Records albums